The "deviant current" or "current of deviation" is a term used by Iranian officials (e.g. high-ranking clerics, Revolutionary Guards commanders) and conservative rivals of Mahmoud Ahmadinejad to describe Ahmadinejad's entourage which functions like a faction or party. Ahmadinejad had some tendency toward Iranian nationalism which deviated from the clerics' theocratic rule, hence top clerics labeled the faction associated with him as "deviant current".

The term was coined in 2011, after an open conflict between Ahmadinejad and the Supreme leader Ali Khamenei.

People 
People who have been described as associated with the "deviant current" include:
 Mahmoud Ahmadinejad
 Esfandiar Rahim Mashaei, described as the leader of the movement
 Hamid Baghaei
 Mohammad Reza Rahimi
 Ali Nikzad
Mojtaba Samareh Hashemi
 Mohammed Sharif Malekzadeh
 Mohammad Aliabadi
 Ali Akbar Javanfekr
 Abdolreza Davari, senior media figure in presidential administration
 Habibollah Joz-e-Khorasani, financial affairs director of the presidential administration
 Abbas Amirifar, cleric, head of the cultural committee of presidential administration
 Kazem Kiapasha, presidential aide
 Bahman Sharifzadeh, cleric
 Abbas Ghaffari, allegedly Ahmadinejad's personal exorcist
Ali Asghar Parhizkar, executive director of the Arvand Free Zone
Alireza Moghimi, executive director of the Aras Free Zone
Parivash Satvati, widow of Hossein Fatemi

Ideology 
The faction is described as "nationalist conservative" by Stratfor; also described as "neo-conservative nationalists" by Pejman Abdolmohammadi, assistant professor in Middle Eastern studies at University of Trento and Giampiero Cama, professor of comparative politics at University of Genova. According to Bernd Kaussler, assistant professor of political science at James Madison University, their ideology is a combination of millenarian, nationalist, populist and the principlist rhetoric. The tendency tries to nationalize Shiite Islamism, and advocates an “Iranian School of Islam” which seems antagonistic toward the Velayat Faqih, an idea that formed the basis of the current establishment in Iran. Ahmadinejad and his associates have regularly used the word "spring" and the phrase "Long live the spring" as a slogan, which is believed to have connotations for the Arab Spring, although Ahmadinejad claims it refers to the reappearance of Imam Mahdi.

Organization 

A group is active under the acronym HOMA (standing for Havadarn-e Mahmoud Ahmadinejad in Persian, meaning "Supporters of Mahmoud Ahmadinejad") and published an online newspaper with the same name. The public relations team organizes various websites, including ,  and Meydan-e Haftadodo  (named after the neighborhood Ahmadinejad lives in) among others. They maintain online activity elsewhere, running many blogs and social media accounts.

Electoral performance

2012
Monotheism and Justice Front, a group that endorsed a list of candidates for 2012 parliamentary elections is reportedly linked to Mashaei. The results showed a major defeat for them in the elections, and they only won 9 seats, according to Deutsche Welle.

2013 
In a Medvedev/Putin-style scenario, Mashaei ran for president in 2013 presidential election backed by Ahmadinejad, who said "Mashaei means Ahmadinejad and Ahmadinejad means Mashaei". He was disqualified by the Guardian Council. 

2013 local elections were the next defeat. The faction were unable to secure a seat in Tehran City Council and even Parvin, Ahmadinejad's sister was unseated.

2017 
In 2017 presidential election, Ahmdinejad who backed Hamid Baghaei, registered as a candidate along with him, but both were disqualified.

2020 
Candidates associated with the circle ran on a list for 2020 parliamentary elections, although Ahmadinejad himself did not support any specific list. 
Middle East Research and Information Project stated that they won 14 seats in the first round of elections.

References 

Persian words and phrases
Political slurs
Political terminology of Iran
Political metaphors
2010s neologisms
Mahmoud Ahmadinejad